Romance of the West is a 1930 American pre-Code western film directed by John Tansey and Robert Emmett Tansey and starring Jack Perrin, Edna Marion and Tom London.

Cast
 Jack Perrin as Jack Walsh
 Edna Marion as 	Mary Winters
 Tom London as 'Kayo' Mooney
 Henry Roquemore as 'Slick' Graham
 Ben Corbett as 	Buck
 Fern Emmett as Landlady
 Dick Hatton as 	Parson
 Edwin August as Chuck Anderson
 James Sheridan as 	Molester 
 Starlight the Horse as Starlight - Jack's Horse

References

Bibliography
 Pitts, Michael R. Western Movies: A Guide to 5,105 Feature Films. McFarland, 2012.

External links
 

1930 films
1930 Western (genre) films
1930s English-language films
American black-and-white films
American Western (genre) films
Films directed by Robert Emmett Tansey
1930s American films